Junthy Valenzuela (born June 5, 1979) is a Filipino former basketball player in the Philippine Basketball Association (PBA), a former Red Bull Barako player. He was automatically pulled by Red Bull directly from the Philippine Basketball League.

On April 14, 2008, he was traded by the Red Bull Barako to the Barangay Ginebra Kings in exchange for a 2009 second round pick and a 2010 first round draft pick.

After his PBA career came to an end, Valenzuela returned to Cebu to coach the University of San Carlos Warriors men's basketball team in the Cebu Schools Athletic Foundation, Inc. (CESAFI), where he, as head coach, led the team to the 2014 CESAFI Finals for the first time since 2007. He resigned as head coach in 2015 to manage his business in Asturias, Cebu.

References

External links
Player Profile
PBA-Online Profile

1979 births
Living people
Barako Bull Energy Boosters players
Barangay Ginebra San Miguel players
Basketball players from Cebu
Cebuano people
Salazar Tech Skyblazers basketball players
Filipino men's basketball coaches
Filipino men's basketball players
Filipino Roman Catholics
People from Bogo, Cebu
Philippine Basketball Association All-Stars
Shooting guards
Small forwards